Ksar Nalut or Ksar Lalot is a fortified granary, or ksar, located in Nalut, Nalut District in Western Libya. Like other ksars created by North African Berber communities, it is located on a hilltop to help protect it from raiding parties. 

Constructed in the 11th century, the Nalut Kasr is a tourist destination, and has been abandoned since the 1960s.

References

Buildings and structures completed in the 11th century
Ksars
Former populated places in Libya
Agricultural buildings in Libya
Fortifications in Libya